Hesitant Alien is the debut studio album by Gerard Way, lead singer of the American rock band My Chemical Romance, released in the US on September 29, 2014 and on September 30 worldwide. It was officially announced in May 2014, although demos of the songs "Zero Zero" and "Millions" have circulated since 2012.  The album was produced by Doug McKean, known for his work as recording engineer on a number of projects with producer Rob Cavallo, including several releases by My Chemical Romance. Hesitant Alien received mostly positive reviews, and was a moderate commercial success reaching No. 16 on the US Billboard 200 and some international charts. To support the album, Way assembled a touring band, "The Hormones".

Background 
On March 22, 2013, My Chemical Romance officially disbanded. This was followed by the release of a greatest hits album entitled May Death Never Stop You a year later.  Having recently signed with Warner Bros. Records,  Gerard went on to announce the beginning of his solo career with the release of an advance-single, "Action Cat", on June 11, 2014. This was accompanied by a new website featuring concept artwork for the album and a new logo. The album's first single, "No Shows", was released on August 18, 2014. "Millions", the second single, was released on November 17, anticipated by a music video released on October 6.

Release and promotion 
"No Shows" was released to radio on August 25, 2014. Hesitant Alien was released on September 29, in the UK, and a day later in the U.S. Pre-orders for both the vinyl and CD versions of the album became available in August, featuring a T-shirt and promotional zine created specifically for the pre-orders. On September 29, 2014, Way premiered Hesitant Alien on the online platform VyRT during a listening party with album commentary. The following month, Way and The Hormones appeared as the musical guest on an episode of Conan. They also toured extensively throughout the world in 2014 and 2015, and performed at several festivals. In February and March 2015, Way performed at Soundwave festival in Australia. On Record Store Day 2016, Way released two exclusive, unreleased tracks from Hesitant Alien titled "Don't Try" and "Pinkish".

Critical reception 

Hesitant Alien received generally positive reviews from critics. At Metacritic, which assigns a normalized rating out of 100 to reviews from mainstream critics, the album has an average score of 75 out of 100, which indicates "Generally favorable reviews" based on 15 reviews. David McLaughlin from Rock Sound magazine stated that some of the songs from the album were some of the best Way has written to date, labelling the album as alternative rock. He also stated that it is nothing like the efforts made into the albums of My Chemical Romance. Jason Pettigrew from Alternative Press said: "Now in his late-30s, he’s going back to the things that turned him on, pretentious ’70s glam-rock, fractured ’80s post-punk and all the English sonic conventions of ’90s Britpop and shoegazer noise", and that the album "has enough requisite cool and clamor to insure [sic] he stays both relevant and remarkably vibrant".

Hesitant Alien topped the "Ten Essential Albums Of 2014" list in Alternative Press. The album was included at number 24 on Rock Sounds "Top 50 Albums of the Year" list. The album was included at number 4 on Kerrang!s "The Top 50 Rock Albums Of 2014" list.

Track listing

Personnel

The Hormones
Gerard Way – lead vocals, rhythm guitar, percussion, piano, bass guitar , keyboards 
Ian Fowles – lead guitar, percussion 
Matt Gorney – bass guitar, piano , guitars , percussion , backing vocals 
Jarrod Alexander – drums, percussion
Jamie Muhoberac – keyboards
James Dewees – keyboards

Additional musicians
Jason Freese – horn 
Tom Rasulo – percussion 
Mikey Way – backing vocals 
Sabina Olague – spoken word

Production
Doug McKean – production
Tom Rasulo – engineer
Andrew Law – assistant engineer
Gerardo "Jerry" Ordonez – assistant engineer
Zach Mauldin – assistant engineer
Lance Sumner – assistant engineer
Tchad Blake – mixing
Bob Ludwig – mastering
Gerard Way – art direction
Norman Wonderly – art direction

Charts

Release history

References
 Citations

Sources

External links

Hesitant Alien at YouTube (streamed copy where licensed)
 Official website

2014 debut albums
Warner Records albums
Gerard Way albums
Albums recorded at Sonic Ranch